Leo Kustaa Häppölä (1 February 1911, Tuulos – 3 July 1998) was a Finnish farmer and politician. He served as Minister of Defence from 13 January 1959 to 14 August 1961. Häppölä was a Member of the Parliament of Finland from 1951 to 1970, representing the Agrarian League, which renamed itself the Centre Party in 1965.

References

1911 births
1998 deaths
People from Hämeenlinna
People from Häme Province (Grand Duchy of Finland)
Centre Party (Finland) politicians
Government ministers of Finland
Members of the Parliament of Finland (1951–54)
Members of the Parliament of Finland (1954–58)
Members of the Parliament of Finland (1958–62)
Members of the Parliament of Finland (1962–66)
Members of the Parliament of Finland (1966–70)